Grand Ayatollah Sayyid Kamal al-Haydari (born 1956) is a Philosopher and Shia marja' from Iraq, who resides in Qom, Iran.

al-Haydari's intellectual output can be loosely grouped with a critical school within Islamic studies sometimes known as madrasat naqd al-turath (school of criticising [religious] heritage). This school is generally known for being critical of "accepted" or purportedly "orthodox" truths, and calls for a renewed examination of previously thought of "unassailable" texts or opinions.

He has argued that Twelver Shi'i thought has by large evolved from a rational/theologically centered school of thought into a jurisprudentially centered school.

Family 
al-Haydari was born into a renowned Karbalaei family, that goes back to their patriarch Mir Haidar al-Husayni, a descendant of the fourth Shi'ite Imam, Ali Zayn al-Abideen. His great grandfather, Sayyid Abdullah al-Haydari (d. 1899) was a grand scholar, and is buried in the Imam Husayn shrine, along with his children. They played a large role in the expansion of the courtyard of the shrine from the south eastern side.

Early life and education 

Al-Haydari was born in 1956 to Baqir al-Haydari, a well-known cloth dealer in Karbala. He completed his elementary, middle and high school education in public schools. His family wanted him to pursue a career in medicine or engineering, but he chose to go down the religious academic path.

Education 
He studied his primary religious studies in Karbala under scholars such as Sheikh Ali al-Eithan al-Ahsa'i, and his son Sheikh Husayn al-Eithan. He then moved to Najaf in 1974 to study at the College of Jurisprudence. He also took lessons at the religious seminary, completing his sutooh studies with Ayatollah Sayyid Muhammad-Taqi al-Hakim and Ayatollah Sayyid Abd al-Saheb al-Hakim. He then began his bahth al-kharij studies with Ayatollah Sayyid Abu al-Qasim al-Khoei, Ayatollah Sayyid Muhammad-Baqir al-Sadr, Ayatollah Sheikh Ali al-Gharawi, and Sayyid Nasrallah al-Mustanbit.

Al-Haydari gained a bachelor's degree in Islamic sciences with honors in 1978 from the College ohttp://alhaydari.com/ar/category/ebooks/quranic/f Jurisprudence, and then migrated to Kuwait in 1980 due to the rising pressures from the Ba'thist authorities, and then to Damascus, where he remained for nearly four months. He then left for Iran via Turkey and settled in the city of Qom. In Qom, he resumed his studies under some of the most learned such as Ayatollah Mirza Jawad Tabrizi, Ayatollah Sheikh Wahid Khorasani, Ayatollah Sheikh Javadi Amoli, and Ayatollah Sheikh Hassanzadeh Amoli.

Religious career 
al-Haydari announced his marja'iyah in 2012. He has been known to be relatively controversial, including his critiques of the opinions of classical scholars such al-Saduq, al-Mufid and al-Hilli, as well as rejecting the idea of unanimity when it came to doctrinal matters. However, his critique that caused the most uproar in his sphere is his contention that the vast majority of surviving traditions in the four main books are a product of forgeries, known as Israʼiliyyat.

He gained a lot of traction on al-Kawthar TV, where he hosted a show and discussed religious matters in the Quran and Hadith. However the show was cancelled in 2013 due to controversial remarks by al-Haydari.

In 2019, al-Haydari supported the demonstrations during the October Revolution in Iraq stating:Corruption has become a phenomenon in the public life of the country facing no religious or legal deterrence. The demonstrations that erupted and that will break out are only a natural reaction to this corruption.

Works

Quranic Books 
 Koran preservation from distortion
 Interpretation of the Koran
 Logic of understanding of the Koran - methodological foundations of explanation and interpretation in the light of a verse of the Kursi (3 parts)
 Pulp of interpretation of the book Koran
 Miracles between theory and practice
 Piety in the Qur'an
 Joseph the righteous 
 Interpretative approach of Allamah al-Haydari
 Assets of interpretation (two parts)

Ideological Books
 Science of Imam, researches in fact and matters of the science of infallible Imams 
 Landmarks of Umayyad Islam
 Tawheed (two parts)
 Tawheed lessons
 Researches in Creed (two parts)
 Formative mandate, its reality and manifestations
 Philosophy of Religion
 Firmly grounded in science
 Concept of intercession in the Qur'an
 In the shadow of faith and morals
 Understanding of religion
 Intercession
 Infallibility - analytical researches in light of the Quranic approach
 Ma'aad in Koranic vision (two parts)
 The Greatest Name, its truth and manifestations
 Hyperbole, its reality and divisions
 Bada and how it occurs in the divine science
 Fate and destiny and the problematic of human act disability
 Authority and making of situation and interpretation
 Tawheed of Sheikh Ibn Taymiyyah
 Researches on the Imamate

Philosophical Books 
 The Philosophy of Mulla Sadra Shirazi: a Reading in the Focal Points of Transcendent Wisdom
 Ma'aad (the Return)
 Intellect, Intellector, and Intellected 
 Philosophy (two parts)
 An Introduction to the Theory of Knowledge as discussed among Islamic Philosophers
 The Essential School of Thought concerning the Theory of Knowledge
 Explorations in Philosophical Psychology
 Commentary on the End of Wisdom (by Allameh Tabataba'i)  (two parts)
 Lessons on Transcendental Wisdom (two parts)
 Commentary on Muzzaffar's Logic (five parts)
 Commentary on the Beginning of Wisdom (by Allameh Tabataba'i) (two parts)
 Divine ideals: Analytical Research concerning the Theory of Plato

Fiqh Books

 No Damage, nor reciprocating
 Fiqh approach of Allamah al-Haydari
 A necessary denier, his truth, terms and rules
 Zakat is due and the dispute of its identification
 Landmarks of Fiqh Renewal
 Book (Zakat)
 Selections from the provisions of the women
 Elected of Hajj and Umrah Rites
 Rites of Hajj
 Fataawa Fiqhiyyah - Worship (two parts)
 Fataawa Fiqhiyyah - Transactions
 Research in the jurisprudence of the sales contract
 One fifth of gains profit
 Book (whole of forbidden gains Fiqh)

 Fundamentals of Islamic Jurisprudence Books
 Conjecture, a study in the authoritative and its divisions and its provisions.
 Explanation of the first episode of Sayed Mohammed Baqir al-Sadr
 Explanation of the third episode of Sayed Mohammed Baqir al-Sadr (two parts)
 Explanation of the third episode of Sayed Mohammed Baqir al-Sadr
 Explanation of the second episode for Sayed Mohammed Baqir al-Sadr (four parts)
 The Reality
 The Fixed and variable in religious knowledge
 Philosophy of Mohammed Albaaj

 Moral books 
 Introduction to Ethics Tawbah, its reality, conditions and effects Spiritual Education Innovations of Allamah Al-Haydari, in the methodology, Tawheed and Imamate
 Priorities methodology in understanding religious knowledge Du'aa Books on Gnosis
 Knowledge of God (two parts)
 From Creation to the Real (min al-khalq ila al-haqq)
 Shiite Gnosis (Irfan)
 Commentary on Establishing Principles'' (by Ibn Turka) (two parts)

References

External links 

 Ayatollah al-Haydari's book library

1956 births
Living people
People from Karbala
Iraqi ayatollahs
Hawza